Johansen Peak is a prominent peak,  high, standing  east-southeast of Mount Grier in the La Gorce Mountains of the Queen Maud Mountains in Antarctica. It was discovered by Rear Admiral Richard E. Byrd on the South Pole Flight of November 28–29, 1929, and mapped in December 1934 by the Byrd Antarctic Expedition geological party under Quin Blackburn. The peak was so named in an attempt to reconcile Byrd's discoveries with the names applied by Roald Amundsen in 1911. Amundsen had named a peak in the general vicinity for Hjalmar Johansen, a member of the Eastern Sledge Party of his 1910–12 expedition.

References

Mountains of Marie Byrd Land